"Easier Said Than Done" is a song written and recorded by American country music artist Radney Foster.  It was released in June 1993 as the third single from the album Del Rio, TX 1959.  The song reached number 20 on the Billboard Hot Country Singles & Tracks chart.

Music video
The music video was directed by Deaton Flanigen and premiered in mid-1993.

Chart performance
"Easier Said Than Done" debuted at number 72 on the U.S. Billboard Hot Country Singles & Tracks for the week of June 12, 1993.

References

1993 singles
Radney Foster songs
Songs written by Radney Foster
Arista Nashville singles
1992 songs